Peter Tudvad (born 27 April 1966 in Holme south of Århus) is a Danish Søren Kierkegaard scholar, author, philosopher and social critic, formerly at the Søren Kierkegaard Research Center and at the University of Copenhagen; he left the Søren Kierkegaard Research Center after a heated debate with colleague Joakim Garff, whose Kierkegaard biography he lambasted in his own book Kierkegaards København.

His 2009 book Nurse in the Third Reich, an account of a Danish woman serving as a nurse in the German Red Cross, achieved some note.

References

External links 
  — a short biography.

Danish philosophers
Academic staff of the University of Copenhagen
People from Aarhus
1966 births
Living people